The number of Chinese people in Serbia according to 2011 census is 1,373. The community resides mainly in Serbia's capital, Belgrade. Most have their origin in two provinces south of the Shanghai region. None of the Chinese have Serbian citizenship.
 
The Chinese immigration to Serbia was prompted after former Yugoslav President Slobodan Milošević and his wife Mira Marković visited China in 1997. There were 30 Chinese people living in Serbia in August 1998. There was a rumor that Milosevic imported over 50,000 Chinese people and gave them Yugoslav passports so that they could vote for him in elections. Other rumors say that the Chinese arrived here in order to take language courses. The newspaper, Večernje novosti, says one part of town in particular has had a complete Chinese village transplanted into it: "The entire population of the Chinese village of Jincun, Kaihua County in Zhejiang province has moved to Belgrade, specifically to Blok 70 where they have businesses in the local center (Kineski centar, "Chinese center") in the suburb of Novi Beograd."

The Chinese send their children to schools in China when they have reached age for primary school, to learn the Chinese language like natives, which is important for the community.

Besides Belgrade (Blok 70), there is also a sizable Chinese community in the second largest Serbian city Novi Sad, which has a Chinese trade center, as well as many Chinese shops and restaurants.

See also

China-Serbia relations

References

External links
Little China in Belgrade 12 February 2001 -- BBC Monitoring
(in Serbian)

Serbia
Serbia
Ethnic groups in Serbia